Guillermo Zschusschen was born on 14 October, 1985 in Breda. He is a Dutch footballer who played for Eerste Divisie club TOP Oss during the 2005–2008 football seasons.

References

Dutch footballers
Footballers from Breda
TOP Oss players
Eerste Divisie players
1985 births
Living people
Association football forwards
21st-century Dutch people